Red Bull GmbH is an Austrian private company known for its range of energy drinks of the same name. It is also known for its sponsorship of a range of sporting events and teams. The headquarters of Red Bull GmbH are located in Fuschl am See, Salzburg.

History

Austrian entrepreneur Dietrich Mateschitz and Thai businessman Chaleo Yoovidhya founded Red Bull GmbH in 1984. While working for German manufacturer Blendax (later acquired by Procter & Gamble) in 1982, Mateschitz traveled to Thailand and met Chaleo, owner of TC Pharmaceuticals. He found that the energy drink Krating Daeng, developed by Chaleo's company during the 1970s, helped to ease his jet lag. After seeing market potential in the drink, he partnered with Chaleo in bringing it to Europe. Under their agreement, the partners invested $500,000 each into founding Red Bull GmbH. In return, they would each receive a 49% stake in the company, with the remaining 2% stake going to Chaleo's son Chalerm. They also agreed that Mateschitz would run the company.

Between 1984 and 1987, Red Bull GmbH modified the formula for Krating Daeng to better match European tastes by carbonating the beverage and making it less sweet. In 1987, the company introduced their adapted energy drink into Austria under the name Red Bull. It found huge success there by marketing to young professionals. The brand expanded throughout Europe during the early 1990s, exploding into the United States market during 1997, grabbing 75% of the market within a year. The wealth of Red Bull's founders grew with the company's success, and by March 2012, both Chaleo and Mateschitz had estimated net worths of over $5.3 billion each. Expanding its distribution to over 171 countries, the company sold 5.2 billion cans of Red Bull in 2012, making it the world's most-consumed energy drink.

In 2018, Red Bull launched its line of organic sodas called Organics by Red Bull, most of it without caffeine.

Distribution
The Red Bull company also distributes and markets a number of other drinks including Simply Cola, the Carpe Diem range of herbal soft beverages and the Sabai Wine Spritzer (the latter in association with the Thai Siam Winery in Thailand).

Marketing

Initially, Red Bull distributed free cases of the drink to college students in an attempt at viral advertising. This strategy was wildly successful, resulting in the rapid proliferation of sales. Red Bull has since become known for its sleek marketing targeted at young urban professionals through various sports and entertainment-based advertising campaigns. The current motto, "Red Bull Gives You Wiiings", directly plays on the stimulating properties of the beverage.

Promotional cars
In addition to this, Red Bull has developed the MET (Mobile Energy Team) program. The teams consist of mostly college students, who drive specially designed Red Bull "Racers". The racers are detailed with the Red Bull logo and most carry an oversized can of Red Bull on their chassis (Suzuki Vitara, MiniCooper, SportTrac, etc.). The METs complete daily missions that include sporting events, businesses, colleges, shopping centres, etc. The Mobile Energy Team is trained to know the properties of the energy drink thoroughly and present them to consumers.

Promotional aircraft

The company uses numerous historic fixed wing and rotary wing aircraft in their promotions including:
 Chance-Vought F4U-4 96995 (OE-EAS) (WWII Fighter)
 Lockheed P-38L-5LO 44-53254 (N25Y)  (WWII Fighter)
 North American B-25J-30NC 44-86893 (N6123C) (WWII Bomber)
 Douglas DC-6B (OE-LDM)

Music industry
The brand is promoted via various music-related activities. In 2007, the company launched its own record label Red Bull Records. It runs the Red Bull Studio recording facility, in Santa Monica. The Red Bull Music Academy organises music workshops and festivals around the world.

The brand also organises and sponsors the famous Red Bull Batalla de Los Gallos. A freestyle competition of hip hop which takes place every year in many Spanish speaking countries.

In 2013, it started an artist development program called Red Bull Sound Select. Randy Randall, of No Age, said he was okay working with Red Bull as the company is not owned by a larger company and the branding of the events is relatively low key. In the same year, the Red Bull Amplifier was launched with help from Sidekick Studios. It plans to assist digital startups by giving access to its audience, events, and facilities. In return Red Bull gets associated with trendy startups.

Sport sponsorship
Since the initial viral campaign, Red Bull's efforts have included sponsoring extreme sport events including cliff diving, BMX, skiing, flying, downhill and free-ride mountain biking and skateboarding. In the 1990s, Red Bull sponsored the rower Xeno Müller, who won an Olympic gold medal in the single sculls in 1996. In 1995, Red Bull sponsored its first motorsports team, the Swiss Formula One team Sauber and in 1999 started sponsoring the Flying Bulls, a Czech aerobatics team. 

Red Bull also owns and conducts the Flugtag ("flight day" in German), a competition where entrants launch themselves off a 10-metre ramp in homemade "flying machines" into a body of water (reminiscent of the Birdman Rally); its own version of the soapbox derby called the Red Bull Soap Box Race; the Red Bull Crashed ice, a world tour, in the winter extreme sporting event, ice cross downhill, which involves downhill skating in an urban environment, on a track which includes steep turns and high vertical drops.

The Red Bull Art of the Can Competition, an international art competition in which artists are asked to create works using the Red Bull can; and the Red Bull BC One individual breakdance competition; also events such as the motorcycle Erzberg Enduro where less than two percent of entrants finish the course.

Red Bull has had a sponsorship presence in a number of sports for some time, especially in the world of motor sport, and has a presence in the Australian V8 Supercars sponsoring the 888 race team, DTM (Deutsche Tourenwagen Masters) especially the Abt Audi team, Dakar Rally sponsoring the KAMAZ Master, VW Race Touareg Team and Peugeot Sport, KTM's Factory teams in various motorcycle racing series, British Superbikes (BSB) Red Bull Honda and HM Plant Red Bull Honda teams, World Rally Championship with the Citroën, Volkswagen, M-Sport Ford and Škoda teams, the SEAT team in the World Touring Car Championship, in Champ Car with Neel Jani and PKV Racing, Rhys Millen's Pontiac in Formula D, sponsoring the GP2 Series team owned by Red Bull Racing team principal Christian Horner, Arden International. They previously sponsored and co-owned both the Sauber and Arrows Formula One teams, the Red Bull Cheever Racing Team in the IRL, and from 2007 to 2011 Team Red Bull competed in the NASCAR Sprint Cup Series. Also Red Bull is now sponsoring the Cyberathlete Professional League and formerly sponsored its own air racing event called the Red Bull Air Race World Championship which contested its final season in 2019. 
The 2005 DARPA Grand Challenge, a competition for driverless cars, was won by a student team from Stanford. The Team's robotically driven Volkswagen Touareg "Stanley" was sponsored by Red Bull.

Red Bull sponsors the Red Bull Rope Masters competition with the National Double Dutch League for the Annual Holiday Classic at the Apollo Theatre in New York City, an event often dominated by teams from Japan featuring fusion double-Dutch (set to hip-hop or contemporary music), and they sponsor other regional events in Memphis, TN and at Morgan State University, to name a few. There are several YouTube videos documenting these events.

Red Bull also has sponsored various racing drivers including NASCAR driver Brian Vickers and Kasey Kahne and Formula One drivers Christian Klien and Vitantonio Liuzzi. Red Bull is also sponsor to young Canadian racing prodigy Robert Wickens and teammate John Michael Edwards in the Champ Car Atlantic Series, as well as rally driver Travis Pastrana, MotoGP riders Dani Pedrosa, Marc Márquez, Maverick Viñales, Stefan Bradl and Jack Miller, American Superbike (AMA) riders Eric Bostrom, Ben Bostrom and Jake Zemke and British Superbike (BSB) riders Jonathan Rea, Eugene Laverty and Ryuchi Kiyonari. Red Bull is sponsoring two new NASCAR teams under 2007; racing under the new Toyota Camry label.
Aside from that, its Thai unit and its Philippine partner has been responsible in forming, licensing, and funding the Red Bull Barako basketball team in the Philippine Basketball Association (PBA) since 2000. It has become one of the more successful sports teams in the Philippines, winning three championships in the PBA.

Red Bull covers the costs to organise the Wings for Life World Run since its first edition in 2014. This permits that the entry fees for the participants can entirely be given to the nonprofit Wings for Life foundation.

Red Bull Sponsorship FIVB Beach Volleyball World Tour.

They also sponsor several cyclocross riders including Wout van Aert and Pauline Ferrand Prevot. This most viable as both riders have Red Bull branded helmets.

They have also sponsored England Cricketer Ben Stokes, and their branding is visible on the back of his bat.

The sponsorship of Exeter Chiefs and England winger Jack Nowell has seen him become the first player with branding on a scrum cap.

Red Bull sponsors extreme cyclists Danny MacAskill and Fabio Wibmer.

Sport ownership
Red Bull has extended its presence to purchasing and entirely re-branding a number of sports teams.

Motorsport

In motorsport, these teams include Red Bull Racing (previously Jaguar Racing before which it was Stewart Grand Prix) and Scuderia AlphaTauri, previously Scuderia Toro Rosso and before that it was Minardi F1 Team. (Scuderia Toro Rosso is Italian for Team Red Bull.) Both teams have scored Grand Prix victories, and Red Bull Racing won the Constructors' Championship for the 2010, 2011, 2012, 2013 and 2022 seasons. Sebastian Vettel won four Drivers' Championships in row in 2010, 2011, 2012, and 2013 while driving for Red Bull Racing. Red Bull Racing driver Max Verstappen won the 2021 and 2022 Formula One Driver's Championship. 

According to Red Bull Team Principal Christian Horner in F1's Netflix original series Formula 1: Drive to Survive, Red Bull is in a unique position wherein they have four drivers (two at Red Bull Racing and two at Scuderia AlphaTauri). He also stated that the drivers in Scuderia AlphaTauri are Red Bull contracted drivers.

In motorcycling, Red Bull is a title sponsor of Red Bull KTM Factory Racing and main sponsor of Repsol Honda.

In 2006, Red Bull announced they would be sponsoring the NASCAR Team Red Bull. They debuted in the Nextel Cup Series at Lowe's Motor Speedway. The team was shut down in December 2011 and its assets acquired by BK Racing.

The Stock Car Brasil team WA Mattheis was sponsored by Red Bull between 2009 and 2016; Cacá Bueno has won the 2009, 2011 and 2012 championships. The Australian Supercars Championship' Triple Eight Race Engineering has also been sponsored by Red Bull since 2013. Jamie Whincup has won three titles in 2013, 2014 and 2017 and team-mate Shane van Gisbergen won the championship in 2016, 2021 and again in 2022 at the Gold Coast 500.

Association football

The company has also been highly active in association football. On 6 April 2005, Red Bull bought the Austrian club SV Austria Salzburg and renamed it to Red Bull Salzburg, a move which has been heavily criticised by supporter groups within Austria and across Europe. They also purchased FC Liefering as Salzburg's feeder club.

In 2005, Red Bull purchased the MetroStars, a team in Major League Soccer representing New York City, from Anschutz Entertainment Group and renamed the franchise; Red Bull New York is the name of the Red Bull subsidiary that operates the team, while the squad itself is known as the New York Red Bulls. Anschutz Entertainment Group was about to begin building the MetroStars their own stadium, but groundbreaking was delayed a month as AEG completed the sale of the team. The company paid for the team's new stadium, Red Bull Arena, which had its match opener 20 March 2010.

In 2007, Red Bull established the lower-division Red Bull Brasil team in the city of Campinas, São Paulo. As the plan to reach the Campeonato Brasileiro Série A in 10 years failed, Red Bull became owners of Série B side Clube Atlético Bragantino in March 2019 and renamed the team to Red Bull Bragantino. Red Bull Bragantino became the champion of the 2019 edition of Série B, and was promoted to the Série A for the 2020 edition.

In June 2009, the company purchased the soccer licence of German fifth division club SSV Markranstädt based near Leipzig, renaming them RB Leipzig for the 2009–10 season onwards. The company stated that its goal was to reach the country's first division, the Bundesliga, within ten years; this goal was ultimately achieved, with RB Leipzig winning four promotions in seven seasons to secure Bundesliga football starting in 2016–17 season.

The current Head of Global Football Operations is Oliver Mintzlaff.

Ice hockey

The company purchased EC Salzburg, the city's team in the Austrian Hockey League, in 2000 and renamed it Red Bull Salzburg. Furthermore, Red Bull took over DEL club EHC München, becoming the team's title sponsor in 2012 before purchasing it outright in 2013.

Esports 

In 2017, Red Bull announced the formation of their new League of Legends team, Red Bulls, which competed in the European League of Legends Challenger Series before folding in 2018. Red Bull sponsors several fighting game players who compete in Tekken and Street Fighter, as well as the Dota 2 team OG, winners of The International 2018 and 2019 tournaments.

Media

Red Bull Media House is a media company specialized in sport, lifestyle, music and games.

The company publishes several magazines: The Red Bulletin (lifestyle), Servus (food, health and gardening); Terra Mater (nature, science and history); Bergwelten (alpinism) and Seitenblicke (celebrities).

Other Red Bull Media House divisions are Red Bull TV, Red Bull Photography, Benevento Publishing, Red Bull Music Academy, Red Bull Records and Red Bull Music Publishing.

Sports championships

Auto racing
 Formula 1 World Drivers' Championships (6)
 2010, 2011, 2012, 2013, 2021, 2022
 Formula 1 World Constructors' Championships (5)
 2010, 2011, 2012, 2013, 2022

Association football

Austrian Bundesliga (13)
 2006–07, 2008–09, 2009–10, 2011–12, 2013–14, 2014–15, 2015–16, 2016–17, 2017–18, 2018–19, 2019–20, 2020–21, 2021–22
 Austrian Cup (7)
 2011–12, 2013–14, 2014–15, 2015–16, 2016–17, 2018–19
 Regionalliga West (1)
 2012–13

Supporters' Shield (3)
 2013, 2015, 2018
 United Soccer League Champions (1)
 2016
 United Soccer League Regular Season Title (1)
 2016
 National Premier Soccer League (1)
 2014

Regionalliga Nordost (1)
 2012–13
 NOFV-Oberliga Süd (2)
 2009–10, 2014–15
 Sachsenliga (1)
 2013–14
 Bezirksliga Leipzig (2)
 2010–11
 Saxony Cup (2)
 2010–11, 2012–13
 Regionalliga promotion playoff 1 (1)
 2012–13
 DFB-Pokal (1)
 2021–22

Campeonato Paulista Série A3 (1)
 2010
 Campeonato Paulista Série B (1)
 2009
 Campeonato Brasileiro Série B (1)
 2019
 Campeonato Paulista do Interior (2)
 2019, 2020
 Campeonato Paulista Group D (1)
 2020

Ice hockey

Austrian Hockey League (7)
 2007, 2008, 2010, 2011, 2014*, 2015, 2016, 2018*
Continental Cup (1)
2010
European Trophy (1)
 2011

Deutsche Eishockey Liga (4)
 2015–16, 2016–17, 2017–18, 2019–20 (RS)

Esports

Dota 2
 The International (2, with OG)
 2018, 2019

F1 2019
 Formula One Esports Series
 2019

F1 2020
 Formula One Esports Series
 2020

References

External links

 Official website

Red Bull
Food and drink companies established in 1984
Food and drink companies of Austria
Food and drink companies of Thailand
Austrian brands
Mass media companies of Austria
Economy of Salzburg (state)
Dietrich Mateschitz